The Sayat-Nova Music School is a music education institution in Yerevan, Armenia.

History 

The school was founded in 1934 by Varduhi Zakaryan as a small musical studio, she became its first director. In 1940, the studio became the third music school in Yerevan and had 200 pupils. In 1944, it was named after the Armenian ashugh Sayat-Nova. The choir and violin classrooms were created in 1970.

Tigran Hekekyan has been Director of the school since 2003.

Alumni 
 Eduard Topchjan
 Tigran Hekekyan
 Svetlana Navasardyan
 Barsegh Tumanyan
 Hasmik Papian
 Konstantin Petrossian
 Gagik Hovunts
 Ruben Sargsyan
 Sergei Babayan
 Vartan Adjemian
 Ruben Altunyan
 Yuri Davtyan

See also 
 Komitas State Conservatory of Yerevan

References

Music schools in Armenia